Mae Charim Wildlife Sanctuary is a wildlife sanctuary in Ban Khok, Fak Tha and Nam Pat districts of Thailand's Uttaradit Province.

Geography
The small streams are tributaries of the Nan River and Nam Pat.

Topography
Landscape is covered by forested mountains, such as Phu Chan, Phu Chang Yai, Phu Heliym, Phu Khem, Phu Pha Dan, Phu Wang. The area is divided into 39% high slope mountain area (shallow valleys, upper slopes, mountain tops and deeply incised streams), 57% hill slope area (open slopes, midslope ridges and u-shaped valleys) and 2% plains.

Flora
The sanctuary features mixed deciduous forest (86%), dry evergreen forest (5%), dry deciduous forest (4%), agricultural area (3%) and savanna (2%).

Fauna
Mammals in the sanctuary are:

Birds, sightings of some 70 species, of which 40 passerine species from 21 families, represented by one species:

and some 30 non-passerine species from 12 families, represented by one species:

Location

See also
 List of protected areas of Thailand
 List of Protected Areas Regional Offices of Thailand

References

Wildlife sanctuaries of Thailand
Geography of Uttaradit province
Tourist attractions in Uttaradit province
1998 establishments in Thailand
Protected areas established in 1998